Eric Floyd (born October 28, 1965) is a former professional American football player who played offensive lineman for five seasons for the Arizona Cardinals, San Diego Chargers, and Philadelphia Eagles in the National Football League (NFL). He played college football for Auburn University after attending West Rome High School in Rome, Georgia.

References

1965 births
American football offensive guards
American football offensive tackles
Arizona Cardinals players
Philadelphia Eagles players
San Diego Chargers players
Auburn Tigers football players
Living people